Late Night Tales: Belle & Sebastian is the 14th release in Late Night Tales series of DJ mix albums. It was compiled and mixed by Belle & Sebastian and was released on 27 February 2006.

Track listing
 "Gratuitous Theft in the Rain" - Rehash
 "How Long Blues" - Jimmy and Mama Yancey
 "Here's What's Left" - RJD2
 "Questions" - Lootpack
 "O My Friends You've Been Untrue to Me" - Demis Roussos
 "French Disko" - Stereolab
 "On a Clear Day You Can See Forever" - The Peddlers
 "Cissy Strut" - The Butch Cassidy Sound System
 "Ring of Fire" - Johnny Cash
 "Free Man" - The Ethiopians
 "Do You Really Want to Rescue Me" - Elsie Mae
 "It's an Uphill Climb (To the Bottom)" - Walter Jackson
 "I'm In Your Hands" - Mary Love
 "Coś Specjalnego" - Novi Singers
 "Lost in the Paradise" - Gal Costa
 "People Make the World Go Round (Kenny Dixon Jr. Remix)" - Innerzone Orchestra
 "Uhuru" - Ramsey Lewis
 "Fly Like an Eagle" - Steve Miller Band
 "Get Thy Bearings" - Donovan
 "Green Grass of Tunnel" - múm
 "Cassaco Marron" - Belle & Sebastian
 "Taireva" - Zimbabwe Shona Mbira Music
 "Let Your Conscience Be Your Guidance" - Space Jam
 "Watch the Sunrise" - Big Star
 "Badinerie from Bach's Orchestral Suite No.2 in B Minor" - Boston Baroque
 "When I Was a Little Girl" - David Shrigley

Follow-Up
The group released the follow-up compilation, Late Night Tales: Belle and Sebastian Vol. II, in 2012.

Casaco Marrom

"Casaco Marrom" (Portuguese: "Brown Coat"; misspelled "Casaco Marron" on the sleeve) is a limited-edition 7-inch single by the Scottish indie band Belle and Sebastian.  1000 copies were pressed and released by Azuli Records in 2006, one week before the release of Azuli's Late Night Tales: Belle & Sebastian compilation, on which both of the single's tracks were also included.  The A-side is Belle & Sebastian's cover of a song by Evinha, of the Brazilian group Trio Esperança.  The B-side is a spoken-word piece by David Shrigley called "When I Was a Little Girl," making the release technically a split single, although it was not promoted as such.

Track listing 
 Belle & Sebastian – "Casaco Marrom" (Evinha)
 David Shrigley – "When I Was a Little Girl" (Shrigley)

References

Belle and Sebastian
2006 compilation albums